Silutitan (meaning "Silk Road giant") is a genus of euhelopodid sauropod dinosaur from the Shengjinkou Formation of Xinjiang, China. It contains only the type species, Silutitan sinensis.

Discovery and naming 
In 2006, a Konservat-Lagerstätte was reported from the Shengjinkou Formation in the Hami region of Xinjiang, China. This consisted of lake sediments allowing for exceptional preservation of fossils. The same year, Qiu Zhanxiang and Wang Banyue started official excavations. 

Among the excavated fossils were six cervical vertebrae with all neural spines intact. In 2021, these were established as the holotype (IVPP V27874) of the new sauropod taxon, Silutitan. A Hamipterus jaw was found near the tenth cervical vertebra, but this is likely due to taphonomy. The generic name, refers to the Silk Road (Silu in Mandarin), while the specific name, sinensis, refers to China.

Classification 
The phylogenetic analysis of Wang et al. places Silutitan as the sister taxon to Euhelopus, a position that does not change when it is combined with the contemporary titanosaur Hamititan into a single unit.

Paleobiology 
Other animals from the holotype locality include the pterosaur Hamipterus and contemporary titanosaur Hamititan, which was described in the same paper. Together, Silutitan, the aforementioned fauna and an unnamed theropod represent the known vertebrate taxa of the area.

References 

Macronarians
Early Cretaceous dinosaurs of Asia
Cretaceous China
Fossil taxa described in 2021